Liam Johnson (born 15 August 1977) is an Australian former rugby league footballer who played for the North Queensland Cowboys in the NRL. He primarily played .

Playing career
In Round 17 of the 1996 ARL season, at 18-years old, Johnson made his first grade debut for the North Queensland Cowboys in their 24–14 win over the Gold Coast Chargers at Carrara Stadium. In Round 21 of the 1996 season, he scored his first try in a 24–20 win over the St George Dragons.

In 1998, Johnson played two NRL games for the Cowboys, spending the majority of the season playing for the Townsville Stingers in the Queensland Cup. In 1999, he played for the Cairns Cyclones.

Statistics

ARL/NRL
 Statistics are correct to the end of the 1998 season

References

1977 births
Living people
Australian rugby league players
North Queensland Cowboys players
Rugby league second-rows